Kai Wiesinger (born 16 April 1966) is a German actor.

Life and work
Wiesinger began taking private acting lessons as a teenager. After his civil service, he became an acting student in Munich. He has been active on German television and in films since 1992.

Selected filmography

Film

Television

Awards and  recognition
 Bavarian Film Awards, Best Actor in Little Sharks (1992)
 nominated for German Film Award, Best Actor in 14 Days to Life (1997)
 Bavarian Film Awards, Best Actor in 14 Days to Life and Hunger – Sehnsucht nach Liebe (1997)
 Bavarian Film Awards, Special Prize as ensemble member for Comedian Harmonists (1997)
 Bavarian TV Award, Best Actor in Television Film category, Der Rücktritt (2014)

References

External links

 
 

1966 births
Living people
Actors from Hanover
German male film actors
Waldorf school alumni
German male television actors
20th-century German male actors
21st-century German male actors